Chakradhara, also known as Sarvadnya Shri Chakradhar Swami or Kunwar Haripaladeva was an Indian saint and philosopher, who is considered as an avatara of Krishna by his disciples and one of the most important exponents of the Dvaita tradition within Hinduism. He is the founder of Mahanubhava Sampradaya of Krishnaism. Shri Chakradhar Swami advocated worship of Lord Krishna and preached a distinct philosophy based on Bhakti. He did not recognize caste distinctions, and like Buddha had only two others viz the householder and recluses. Some sources claim that Chakrapani Prabhu and Govinda Prabhu as the originators of Mahanubhava doctrine and Chakradhara as the first apostle who systematized Mahanubhava as a school of Bhakti philosophy. Chakradhara's birth anniversary is observed on the Tithi of Bhadrapada Shukla Dwitiya.

Life 
Shri Chakradhara was born into a Gujarati Samavedi Brahmin family in Bharuch, Gujarat. He is referred as the son of a royal minister of Gujarat according to his biography Lilacharitra. He took Sannyasa at a young age and left his home for pilgrimage of Ramtek. During his journey, he received initiation from his guru Shri Govinda Prabhu at Ridhapur, which is in modern-day Amravati district. Then for twelve years he stayed in forests of Vindhya mountain as an ascetic. After attaining the awakening, he started preaching a new philosophy, i.e. Mahanubhava tattvajnana to the common people. Although his native language was Gujarati, he had excellent command over Marathi. He moved among all sections of society. He discoursed his philosophy extremely effectively among the people in their own language. The Lilacharitra confirms that he also spoke fluent Sanskrit along with Gujarati and Marathi. Chakradhara used formulaic language full of meaning in a compact style. He insisted that his disciples should write only in Marathi and therefore, Marathi literature became rich with the teachings of Shri Chakradhar Swami and Mahanubhava Sampradaya.

Philosophy
One of the most important aspects of the philosophy propounded by Shri Chakradhara are asceticism and renunciation. His fourfold teachings are: non-violence, celibacy, asceticism and bhakti. And the different aspects of Gods incarnations to be worshipped are: name, form, activity, deeds, place, vachanas (Shruti), memories (Smriti) and the blessing of God incarnate. He considered five divine incarnations of god as supreme entity, which are known as 'Pancha Krishna', namely: Shri Dattatreya, Bhagavan Shri Krishna, Shri Chakrapani, Shri Govinda Prabhu and Shri Chakradhara himself.

One can practice bhakti by memorizing deeds of the Almighty. The aspirant for salvation must sacrifice his country, village and his relations and offer his life to God. Chakradhar Swami also taught the disciple of the sect when, where, how, how much alms they should be beg for. The central theme of his teaching was, "Feel the soul and not the body". Living the life of mendicant and practicing asceticism severely, the devotee should live according to principle, "God is mine and I am God’s". The core of his code of behaviour is summed up in the following line for the benefit of his followers: "Even if the head is cut off, the body should worship God".

Besides teaching strict vegetarianism, the Mahanubhava Sampradaya forbids the use of alcohol and teaches non-violence. The religion survives to the present. It teaches that Krishna is the only ultimate of Gods and all the other gods are just powers of him. It is understood from various scriptures of Mahanubhava Sampradaya that Nirvana (Moksha) can only be achieved by knowing and worshiping Krishna as the lone ultimate and thus one must give up on worshiping and getting involved unconsciously in the other powers of ultimate, It can be relatively explained as one should not be satisfied in loving the creation but love the creator.

References

Mahanubhava sect
Medieval Hindu religious leaders
Vaishnavite religious leaders
Vaishnava saints
Devotees of Krishna
Dvaitin philosophers
Gujarati people
Hindu ascetics
Hindu philosophers and theologians
13th-century Indian philosophers
Indian Hindu monks
Scholars from Gujarat
Indian Hindu spiritual teachers
Anti-caste activists
Hindu revivalists
Indian Vaishnavites
Marathi-language writers
Indian social reformers
People from Bharuch district‎ 
People considered avatars by their followers
Bhakti movement